

Wipe out or wipeout may refer to:

Media

Music
 "Wipe Out" (instrumental), a 1963 hit surf-rock song by The Surfaris
 Wipe Out (album), the 1963 album containing the song

Television
 Wipeout (1988 game show), an American trivia competition show
 Wipeout (British game show), a 1994–2003 British derivative of the above program
 Wipeout (1999 game show), a 1999–2000 Australian derivative of the above program
 Wipeout (2008 game show), an American competition television show featuring obstacle courses that was broadcast on ABC
 Any of various international versions of this show
 Any of various video games based on the show
 Wipeout (2021 game show), a 2021 American reboot of the 2008 game show that airs on TBS

Video games
 Wipeout (video game series), a video game series
 Wipeout (video game), the first game in the series
 Total party kill or wipeout, in roleplaying games, when an entire group is killed by hostile units

Amusement rides
 Wipeout (Dreamworld), a specific ride in Australia
 Wipeout (ride), a type of amusement ride
 Wipeout (roller coaster), a Boomerang roller coaster

Other uses
 Wipe out (surfing), a surfing term
 Wipe Out (tennis), a tennis game
 Wipeout (comics), a fictional character
 Wipeout (elections), a dramatic loss

See also
 The Wipeouters, an alias of the American band Devo